Cooksbridge railway station serves the village of Cooksbridge in East Sussex, England. It is on the East Coastway Line,  from  via . Train services are provided by Southern.

The station is unstaffed. A PERTIS ticket machine was installed in 2008 on both the London-bound and the Lewes-bound platform.

History 

Cooksbridge lies on the London, Brighton and South Coast Railway "cut-off" line between Keymer Junction, near Wivelsfield on the Brighton Main Line, and Lewes. The erstwhile Brighton, Lewes and Hastings Railway were authorised to build the line in 1845; the LBSCR purchased it and opened the link on 1 October 1847. The station opened as Cook's Bridge on the same date. The first station master was Richard Strevett who stayed until promoted to Hailsham on 17 August 1861. This replacement (George Bennett) lasted only a few weeks, arriving on 16 August 1861 and returning to his old job (porter at Brighton) on 6 September 1861. His replacement, Alfred Paver, was appointed on 13 September 1861.

The initial services were very sparse. The May 1848 timetable shows Up Trains to London at 8.30am and 5.50pm and a London arrivals at 9am. (Afternoon passengers were directed to travel via Lewes on the 5.50pm train).

During May 2020, Platform 1 was extended to accommodate 8 coach trains, as opposed to a previous 6.

Services 

All services at Cooksbridge are operated by Southern using  EMUs.

The typical off-peak service in trains per hour is:
 1 tph to  via 
 1 tph to  

Prior to December 2019, the station was served by a limited weekday service only with no weekend services. In December 2019, a regular hourly service was introduced on weekdays and Saturdays, followed by an hourly Sunday service in May 2020.

References

External links 

Railway stations in East Sussex
DfT Category F2 stations
Former London, Brighton and South Coast Railway stations
Railway stations in Great Britain opened in 1847
Railway stations served by Govia Thameslink Railway
1847 establishments in England
Hamsey